Stuff is the debut studio album by Canadian singer-songwriter Holly McNarland, released in Canada on June 24, 1997 by Universal. The album was released in the United States on October 7, 1997. The album includes the singles "Elmo", "Coward" and the hit single "Numb". The album was certified Platinum in Canada, and is McNarland's best-selling album to date.

Cover
The album cover featured McNarland and her Jack Russell Terrier Owen. The dog also appears in the video for the single "Elmo". 

Stuffs cover was listed in Pitchforks feature on "The Worst Record Covers of All Time".

Reception
In his retrospective review for AllMusic, Alex Henderson wrote "With Alanis Morissette and Fiona Apple burning up the charts, the mid- to late 1990s were more than friendly to angst-ridden female rockers. One of the most compelling 'angry young woman' releases of 1997 was Holly McNarland's Stuff, which gives the impression that the Canadian singer/songwriter lives and breathes dysfunction."

Track listing
All songs written by Holly McNarland unless otherwise noted.

"Numb" – 3:57
"Elmo" – 4:40
"Porno Mouth" (McNarland, Adam Drake) – 4:16
"Water" (McNarland, Mark Pullyblank) – 5:32
"Coward" – 4:41
"The Box" – 3:15
"U.F.O." – 4:39
"Mystery Song" – 5:05
"Just in Me" – 2:20
"Twisty Mirror" – 3:14
"I Won't Stay" – 4:06

*bonus track on some editions

Personnel
Holly McNarland – vocals, acoustic and electric guitar
Joey Santiago, Jay Joyce – guitar
Susie Katayama – cello
Mark Pullyblank – bass
Adam Drake – drums
Gaëtan Schurrer – programming

References

1997 albums
Holly McNarland albums